Pedro Henrique dos Santos Calçado (born 4 August 1986), simply known as Pedrinho, is a Brazilian footballer who plays as a striker.

External links 
 
 Pedrinho at playmakerstats.com (English version of ogol.com.br)

1986 births
Living people
Association football forwards
Brazilian footballers
Londrina Esporte Clube players
Adap Galo Maringá Football Club players
Msida Saint-Joseph F.C. players
Sliema Wanderers F.C. players
Balzan F.C. players
Police United F.C. players
Mosta F.C. players
Al-Fayha FC players
Maltese Premier League players
Thai League 1 players
Saudi First Division League players